Ezequiel Alejandro Rodríguez (born 26 October 1990) is an Argentine professional footballer who plays as a forward for Primera Nacional side Temperley.

Career
After periods with All Boys and Jorge Newbery, Rodríguez made the move to Sportivo Rivadavia in 2011. Three years later, Rodríguez joined Tristán Suárez of Primera B Metropolitana on loan for two seasons. He made his first appearance in professional football on 9 August 2014, playing the final six minutes of a 1–2 win over Colegiales. In May 2015, he scored the first two goals of his pro career in a win away to Sportivo Italiano. Rodríguez returned to Sportivo Rivadavia in late-2015 following four goals in forty-seven games for Tristán Suárez. Primera B Metropolitana's Atlanta completed the signing of Rodríguez in January 2016.

He remained with Atlanta for the 2016 and 2016–17 campaigns, making forty-one appearances and netting three goals. July 2017 saw Rodríguez join Argentine Primera División side Tigre. He was sent off on his top-flight debut against Belgrano on 22 September.

Career statistics
.

References

External links

1990 births
Living people
Sportspeople from San Miguel de Tucumán
Argentine footballers
Association football midfielders
Torneo Argentino C players
Torneo Argentino B players
Primera B Metropolitana players
Argentine Primera División players
CSyD Tristán Suárez footballers
Club Atlético Atlanta footballers
Club Atlético Tigre footballers
Club Atlético Temperley footballers